The Kids League (TKL) is a non-profit NGO registered in Uganda in 2004.

Aim
The aim of the organisation are to help boys and girls aged 8–15 in Uganda improve their lives using sport as a means to create education, health and life skills awareness.

Formation
TKL was founded in 2003 by Trevor Dudley after five years of success with Kampala Kids League (Uganda) (KKL) whose talented kids have won 21 International soccer tournaments in the last eight years. They are six times Gothia Cup World Youth Cup champions, Norway Cup winners, Haarlem Cup Amsterdam) winners, eight time Tivoli Cup winners and 3-time winners of Football Festival in Denmark, this league is now one of the most successful of its kind in Africa.

Recognition
Trevor Dudley was awarded a Fellowship from Ashoka Foundation in 2003 for creating significant social change in Kampala. This helped to stimulate expansion of the programme in Uganda. He was awarded an MBE in the New Years Honours of 2008 for services to children's sport and health education in Uganda. TKL was nominated and shortlisted for the UNICEF Children's Rights Award in the inaugural 'Beyond Sport' Awards held in London in July 2009 for improving lives of children in the conflict zones of Karamoja.

Ann Dudley, co-founder of The Kids League was made an Alumni Laureate of Nottingham University in 2009 for Special Excellence in Community Work for her work in Uganda.

In 2010, in recognition of its outstanding achievement to Sport in Development through Football The Kids League, together with 31 other groups from all over the world,  qualified for the Football For Hope Festival, an official part of the FIFA 2010 World Cup in South Africa.

Activities
The Kids League, mainly active in the country's northern conflict zones, provides rural districts in Uganda with the same quality sports leagues as those established under KKL.

During its existence Football and netball programmes transmitting health and education messages have been established in 11 Districts across northern Uganda including Gulu, Amuru, Kitgum, Arua, Pader, Lira, Apac, Kumi, Moroto and Nakapiripirit.

Over 60,000 boys and girls have taken part in TKL activities which aim to promote inclusion and break down social, economic and religious barriers. TKL invite Kids from all faiths to mix with out of school children, orphans, street children, ex child soldiers and traumatised children to help bond friendships.  

TKL has trained over 2,000 community volunteers to run the programmes.

The programmes have been supported by international donors such as UNICEF, USAID, CORE Initiative, the World Health Organisation], Sport Relief and UK Sport and local corporates such as Stanbic Bank, MTN, Western Union, Celtel, and General Machinery. TKL also seeks support from International Companies under their CSR programmes such as Nike, and Foundations such as Hewlett to partner with international donors. Several Schools, colleges and individuals in the UK and USA also offer awareness raising and technical support for this innovative programme.

In November 2007, TKL was honoured with a visit by the Prince of Wales who wanted to see the successes of the programme. It was the first visit of the Prince of Wales to Uganda.

Prince Charles visited the offices of TKL and met all the staff and 20 boys and girls representing programmes that Kampala Kids League and The Kids League have established. Prince Charles lifted one of the Gothia Cup trophies and took penalties against one of the boys much to the delight of the waiting photographers. The Prince of Wales graciously unveiled a plaque on the KKL office block to commemorate the visit.

TKL plans to develop further inclusive programmes across Uganda in the next few years encouraging more girls to play sport, developing its 'A League' sports programmes that would allow more children with disability to take part in TKL activities and to develop an income generating programme to manufacture locally sports equipment for schools.

External links 
 The Kids League website

Non-profit organisations based in Uganda
Sport in Uganda
Organizations established in 2003
2003 establishments in Uganda